Traditionally, conflict is a major literary element of narrative or dramatic structure that creates challenges in a story by adding uncertainty as to whether the goal will be achieved. In works of narrative, conflict is the challenge main characters need to solve to achieve their goals. However, narrative is not limited to a single conflict. While conflicts may not always resolve in a narrative, the resolution of a conflict creates closure or fulfillment, which may or may not occur at a story's end.

Basic nature
Conflict in literature refers to the different drives of the characters or forces involved. Conflict may be internal or external—that is, it may occur within a character's mind or between a character and exterior forces, (or point(s) of view). Conflict is most visible between two or more characters, usually a protagonist and an antagonist/enemy/villain, but can occur in many different forms. A character may as easily find themselves in conflict with a natural force, such as an animal or a weather event, like a hurricane. The literary purpose of conflict is to create tension in the story, making readers more interested by leaving them uncertain which of the characters or forces will prevail.

There may be multiple points of conflict in a single story, as characters may have more than one desire or may struggle against more than one opposing force. When a conflict is resolved and the reader discovers which force or character succeeds, it creates a sense of closure. Conflicts may resolve at any point in a story, particularly where more than one conflict exists, but stories do not always resolve every conflict. If a story ends without resolving the main or major conflict(s), it is said to have an "open" ending. Open endings, which can serve to ask the reader to consider the conflict more personally, may not satisfy them, but obvious conflict resolution may also leave readers disappointed in the story.

Classification 
The basic types of conflict in fiction have been commonly codified as "man against man", "man against nature", and "man against self." Although frequently cited, these three types of conflict are not universally accepted. Ayn Rand, for instance, argued that "man against nature" is not a conflict because nature has no free will and thus can make no choices. Sometimes a fourth basic conflict is described, "man against society". Some of the other types of conflict referenced include "man against machine" (The Terminator, Brave New World), "man against fate" (Oedipus Rex), "man against the supernatural" (The Shining) and "man against God" (A Canticle for Leibowitz).

Man against man
"Man against man" conflict involves stories where characters are against each other. This is an external conflict. The conflict may be direct opposition, as in a gunfight or a robbery, or it may be a more subtle conflict between the desires of two or more characters, as in a romance or a family epic. This type of conflict is very common in traditional literature, fairy tales and myths. One example of the "man against man" conflict is the relationship struggles between the protagonist and the antagonist stepfather in This Boy's Life. Other examples include Dorothy's struggles with the Wicked Witch of the West in The Wonderful Wizard of Oz and Tom Sawyer's confrontation with Injun Joe in The Adventures of Tom Sawyer.

Man against nature
"Man against nature" conflict is an external struggle positioning the character against an animal or a force of nature, such as a storm or tornado or snow. The "man against nature" conflict is central to Ernest Hemingway's The Old Man and the Sea, where the protagonist contends against a marlin. It is also common in adventure stories, including Robinson Crusoe. The TV show Man vs. Wild takes its name from this conflict, featuring Bear Grylls and his attempts to survive nature.

Man against self
With "man against self" conflict, the struggle is internal. A character must overcome their own nature or make a choice between two or more paths—good and evil; logic and emotion. A serious example of "man against himself" is offered by Hubert Selby Jr.'s 1978 novel Requiem for a Dream, which centers around stories of addiction. In the novel Fight Club by Chuck Palahniuk, published in 1994, as well as in its 1999 film adaptation, the unnamed protagonist struggles against himself in what is revealed to be a case of dissociative identity disorder. Bridget Jones's Diary also focuses on internal conflict, as the titular character deals with her own neuroses and self-doubts.

Man against society
Sometimes a fourth basic conflict is described, "man against society". Where man stands against a man-made institution (such as slavery or bullying), "man against man" conflict may shade into "man against society".  In such stories, characters are forced to make moral choices or frustrated by social rules in meeting their own goals. The Handmaid's Tale, The Man in the High Castle and Fahrenheit 451 are examples of "man against society" conflicts. So is Charlotte's Web, in which the pig Wilbur fights for his survival against a society that raises pigs for food.

History 
As with other literary terms, these have come about gradually as descriptions of common narrative structures.  Conflict was first described in ancient Greek literature as the agon, or central contest in tragedy.  According to Aristotle, in order to hold the interest, the hero must have a single conflict.  The agon, or act of conflict, involves the protagonist (the "first fighter") and the antagonist (a more recent term), corresponding to the hero and villain. The outcome of the contest cannot be known in advance, and according to later critics such as Plutarch, the hero's struggle should be ennobling.

Even in modern non-dramatic literature, critics have observed that the agon is the central unit of the plot.  The easier it is for the protagonist to triumph, the less value there is in the drama.  In internal and external conflict alike, the antagonist must act upon the protagonist and must seem at first to overmatch them.  For example, in William Faulkner's The Bear, nature might be the antagonist.  Even though it is an abstraction, natural creatures and the scenery oppose and resist the protagonist.  In the same story, the young boy's doubts about himself provide an internal conflict, and they seem to overwhelm him.

Similarly, when godlike characters enter (e.g. Superman), correspondingly great villains have to be created, or natural weaknesses have to be invented, to allow the narrative to have drama. Alternatively, scenarios could be devised in which the character's godlike powers are constrained by some sort of code, or their respective antagonist.

See also 
 Deus ex machina
 Mythos (Aristotle)
 Theme (narrative)

References

External links 
 Literary terms Dictionary Online. 
 The "Basic" Plots In Literature. Information on the most common divisions of the basic plots from the Internet Public Library organization. 

 
Narratology